Scopus xenopus is an extinct species of hamerkop that lived during the Pliocene of South Africa. It was first described by Storrs L. Olson in 1984. Compared to S. umbretta, the modern hamerkop, S. xenopus was larger and had a foot structure more adapted to swimming.

References

Pelecaniformes
Pliocene birds
Fossil taxa described in 1984